The Centauro-class patrol boat is a series of four patrol boats in service with the Portuguese Navy. It is an evolution of the preceding . This class is meant for fisheries inspection and control duties mainly in the Mainland Portugal shores – with some sporadic presence in the Madeira Archipelago. The Centauro class is Portuguese-designed and built at the Arsenal do Alfeite (Almada) and Estaleiros Navais do Mondego (Figueira da Foz).

Design and description
The vessels are powered by two Cummins KTA-50-M2 diesel engines turning two shafts creating . The Centauros are equipped with two Cummins 6BT5.95(M) diesel generators producing 150 kW of electricity. The ships can operate in sea state 3.

The patrol boats mount a single Oerlikon /70 Mk 4 gun for anti-air defence. The ships were equipped with navigational radar only. The vessels have a complement of eight, including one officer.

Construction and career
The class were ordered in 1998 as an improved version of the Argos class. They were designed and built in Portugal. Upon entering service, the vessels were deployed for fisheries protection, search and rescue and general patrol. The Centauros take part in some naval exercises and some training. In 2006, one boat of this class, NRP Sagitário, became the first Portuguese warship with a female commander, the second lieutenant Gisela Antunes.

Ships

Notes

Citations

References
 
 
 
 
 
 

Patrol vessels of the Portuguese Navy
Patrol boat classes
Ships built in Portugal
Military equipment of Portugal